Aleksander Wrona (11 May 1940 – 19 September 2022) was a Polish field hockey player. He competed in the men's tournament at the 1972 Summer Olympics.

He died on 19 September 2022, at the age of 82.

References

External links
 

1940 births
2022 deaths
Polish male field hockey players
Olympic field hockey players of Poland
Field hockey players at the 1972 Summer Olympics